Unió Esportiva Santa Coloma, also known as UE Santa Coloma, is a football club from Andorra based in the village of Santa Coloma, Andorra la Vella. The club currently plays in Primera Divisió.

History
UE Santa Coloma was founded on 23 September 1986 in the village of Santa Coloma. In 1996 the club established a football academy to give a qualitative leap in the field of sports in the country. During few seasons the club acted as farm team for many Andorran  teams including FC Santa Coloma. The first football department team was refounded, after being inactive many years, in 2006 by joining the Andorran football league Segona Divisió the following year.

The team plays in the Primera Divisió after winning the Segona Divisió in the 2007–08 season. The club made its first appearance in European competition in the 2010–11 UEFA Europa League after finishing second in the league in the 2009–10 season.

In 2013 the team won his first trophy  in the Copa Constitució after defeating 3–2 Sant Julià in the average time. Three years later UE Santa Coloma was crowned again as Andorran's Cup winner after defeating 3-0 UE Engordany in 2016.

Colours and badge
Yellow has been the traditional UE Santa Coloma color. Manly of the home kits alternate yellow and black. Even then in its beginnings the club dressed up the colors of the parish of Andorra la Vella, green and navy, and occasionally wearing an orange kit during some seasons.

Until 2013 the badge was representing Santa Coloma's pre-romanical church tower and the most traditional team icon, the squirrel. The nowadays crest still represent the icons of UE Santa Coloma, featuring the club colours (yellow and black) and the year of foundation (1986).

The club have an alternative badge (main crest during the first leg of the 2013–14 season) representing the Santa Coloma's squirrel and the colours of the Andorran nation with the motto's country "Virtus Unita Fortior".

* Since the Andorra Football Federation affiliation.

Support
The club's nickname, as seen from the crest, is Esquirols (Squirrels) due to the number of the animals that live around the town of Santa Coloma. There is a long-standing tradition for a number of fans to wear squirrel costumes at the club's last home game of each season.

Club rivalries

El Derbi Colomenc

The local rival of UE Santa Coloma is actually their neighbour's hometown football team FC Santa Coloma. The rivalry between these two teams has increased since the 2009/10 season when those teams were competing for winning the Premier Andorran League.

Honours
Primera Divisió:
Runners-up (2): 2009–10, 2013–14
Copa Constitució: 
Winners (3): 2013,  2016, 2017
Runners-up (2): 2010, 2011
Supercopa Andorrana:
Winners (1): 2016
Runners-up (1): 2013
Segona Divisió:
Winners (1): 2007–08

League history

European results

Current squad
As of 21 January 2023

External links
UE Santa Coloma Official Web
Club profile at UEFA

References

 
Football clubs in Andorra
Sport in Andorra la Vella
1986 establishments in Andorra
Association football clubs established in 1986